Sierra Leone competed at the 1996 Summer Paralympics in Atlanta, Georgia, United States. The delegation consisted of a single competitor, Kelley Marah in track and field athletics. Marah was registered in four events, but ended up competing in only one, the javelin throw. He did not win a medal.

Athletics

See also 
 Sierra Leone at the 1996 Summer Olympics

References

Nations at the 1996 Summer Paralympics
1996
Paralympics